is a Japanese politician of the Liberal Democratic Party, a member of the House of Representatives in the Diet (national legislature). A native of Aioi, Hyōgo and graduate of Nihon University, he was elected to the House of Councilors for the first time in 1992 as a member of Morihiro Hosokawa's Japan New Party and then to the House of Representatives for the first time in 1996.

References

External links 
 Official website in Japanese.

1950 births
Living people
Politicians from Hyōgo Prefecture
Nihon University alumni
Members of the House of Councillors (Japan)
Members of the House of Representatives (Japan)
Japan New Party politicians
Liberal Democratic Party (Japan) politicians
21st-century Japanese politicians